Olga Kosheleva (born 8 October 1932) is a Soviet sprinter. She competed in the women's 200 metres at the 1956 Summer Olympics.

References

External links
 

1932 births
Living people
Athletes (track and field) at the 1956 Summer Olympics
Soviet female sprinters
Olympic athletes of the Soviet Union
Place of birth missing (living people)
Olympic female sprinters